OAHS may refer to:

Oxford Area High School
Oxfordshire Architectural and Historical Society